Mark J. Romanczuk represented the United States in numerous international baseball tournaments. He won a silver medal for the nation's national team in the 2003 Pan American Games. In the 2004 World University Baseball Championship, he won a gold medal.

Romanczuk also won the Louisville Slugger Freshman of the Year award in 2003, alongside pitcher Glen Perkins, catcher Jeff Clement and pitcher Stephen Head, while a pitcher at Stanford University. He played four seasons professionally after being drafted by the Arizona Diamondbacks in the 4th round of the 2005 Major League Baseball Draft. He was 12-17 with a 5.14 ERA in 71 pro games.

He was born September 24, 1983 in Philadelphia, Pennsylvania.

References

1983 births
Living people
Baseball players at the 2003 Pan American Games
Pan American Games medalists in baseball
Pan American Games silver medalists for the United States
United States national baseball team players
Medalists at the 2003 Pan American Games
American Defenders of New Hampshire players
Bridgeport Bluefish
Missoula Osprey players
South Bend Silver Hawks players
St. Paul Saints (AA) players
Stanford Cardinal baseball players